Nation19 is a magazine that blends hip-hop culture, photojournalism, activism, and anthropology. The printed and digital magazine is produced and published by multimedia activists, visual anthropologists, and film directors Queen Muhammad Ali and Hakeem Khaaliq. The magazine was started in the winter of 2010. Nation19 also produces documentary films and hosts exhibits based on various of its articles. Nation19 is defined by its large photo spreads and motifs of indigenous empowerment, archeological research, and social change.

Scope 
Investigative journalism is a regular element of the magazine. A controversial interview with deceased CIA whistleblower and activist Michael Ruppert was published in the "Survival Edition" shortly after his death. The piece focused on the Fukushima nuclear disaster and other issues related to the Pacific Ocean.

References

External links 
 

2010 establishments in Arizona
African-American magazines
Lifestyle magazines published in the United States
Music magazines published in the United States
Hip hop magazines
Independent magazines
Magazines established in 2010
Magazines published in Arizona
Mass media in Phoenix, Arizona